Upper Bayang (sometimes Banyang) is a district of Cameroon located in the Manyu department and the South West region. The district seat is located at Tinto (Tinto Council). Home to the Banyangi people.

At the 2005 census, Upper Bayang had a population of 27,485.

Administrative structure of the municipality 

The borough includes the following localities:

 Adjeli
 Agong
 Akiriba
 Amebisu
 Ashum
 Atibong Wire
 Ayukaba Betieku
 Babat 
Bachuo Akagbe
 Batambé
 Bakebe
 Bakumba Batieku
 Bokwa
 Chinda
 Defang
 Ebangabi
 Ebeagwa
 Ebensuk
 Edjuingang
 Egbemoh
 Ekpor
 Etoko
 Etoko-Mbatop
 Eyang Atemako
Fotabe
 Gurrifen
 Kekpoti
Kendem
Kenyang
 Kepelle
 Koano
 Mamboh
 Mantah I
 Mantah II
 Mbanga-Pongo
 Mbeme
 Mbinjong
 Mbio
 Mekwecha
 Moshie
 Nchemba I
 Nchemba II
 Nfainchang
 Nfaitock
 Ntenmbang
 Numba
 Obang 3 Corners
 Sabs
Sumbe
 Tali I
 Tali II
 Tayor
 Tinto-Kerieh

References

External links
 Site de la primature - Élections municipales 2002 
 Contrôle de gestion et performance des services publics communaux des villes camerounaises - Thèse de Donation Avele, Université Montesquieu Bordeaux IV 
 Charles Nanga, La réforme de l’administration territoriale au Cameroun à la lumière de la loi constitutionnelle n° 96/06 du 18 janvier 1996, Mémoire ENA. 

Communes of Southwest Region (Cameroon)